Island of Fire is a 1990 Taiwanese-Hong Kong action film directed by Kevin Chu, and starring Jackie Chan, Andy Lau, Sammo Hung, Tony Leung Ka-fai and Tou Chung-hua. The film was shot in Taiwan and the Philippines in 42 days from 5 April until 17 May 1989. The film's theme song, The Last Gunshot (最後一槍) by Cui Jian, was written as a response to the 1989 Tiananmen Square protests and massacre in Beijing, China.

This is the third collaboration between producer Jimmy Wang Yu and Jackie Chan, With their first, collaboration being Killer Meteors in 1976, the film's producer and co-star, Jimmy Wang Yu, came to Chan's aid when the then young actor sought his help in settling a dispute with the veteran director Lo Wei. The dispute was settled by Golden Harvest paying 10 million HK dollars (2 million US dollars) to Lo Wei. Chan repaid the favor by acting in Wang's 1983 film Fantasy Mission Force.

As with both of those earlier films, recent DVD and VHS releases market Island of Fire & Jackie Chan Is the Prisoner as a Jackie Chan film, displaying an image of Chan on the cover as though the lead actor. In fact, Chan only appears in a supporting role, with Tony Leung Ka-fai as the central character.

Synopsis
In the Taiwanese version, the film begins with the execution of a prisoner inside a prison.

Wang Wei (Tony Leung Ka-fai), a police officer, witnesses the murder of his father-in-law, a police commissioner, at the hands of an assassin. When the assassin attempts to escape, he is killed by a car bomb. Wei and his partner later identify the assassin but discover that he was a felon who was apparently executed in prison several months ago. Wei decides to go undercover in the prison by assaulting a group of gang members at a bar. While inside, he is immediately suspected of being a cop and is beaten in a prison-orchestrated fight, leaving him bloodied and bruised.

Wei's fellow prisoners include Da Chui (Jackie Chan), who accidentally killed a card player while trying to raise money for an operation to save his girlfriend's life; Iron Ball (Andy Lau), who has himself thrown in jail to exact revenge for his dead brother killed by Da Chui; and Fatty (Sammo Hung), a compassionate but pathetic inmate who frequently escapes visiting his young son. Significant tension occurs when Chui and Iron Ball are part of the same block, but any attempts on Chui's life are forbidden by Lucas (Jimmy Wang Yu), a powerful warlord within the prison. This ends when Lucas is set up and killed by the prison when he and Fatty escape. Fatty attempts to escape yet again during an outdoor workday, but kills a prison guard when Fatty hits him with a police cruiser; Fatty is subsequently executed. With Lucas gone and the corruption of the guards plain to see, Wei and Chui are at risk. An attempt on Wei's life accidentally kills Wei's cellmate Charlie (Tou Chung-hua), prompting a large-scale riot in which the head guard is assaulted by Chui and eventually killed by Wei. In response, Chui, Iron Ball, and Wei are executed.

Wei suddenly awakens in an undisclosed location where the Warden greets him. The Warden says that he fakes the execution of the inmates so that he can recruit them to be part of a vigilante hit squad. Wei is dispatched along with Chui, Fatty, and Iron Ball, to an airport where a drug lord is being extradited. They kill the drug lord, but are betrayed by the Warden, like the assassin that killed Wei's father-in-law, and barely dodge a car bomb meant for them. They become surrounded in an airport tower and take a police captain hostage. Wei's partner, who was present with the police escorting the drug lord, helps Wei hijack a plane and Fatty, Chui, and Iron Ball attempt to reach the plane. Fatty, Chui, and Iron Ball are all gunned down as Wei escapes.

When the Warden returns to his home, he finds Wei waiting for him, asking for answers. The Warden explains that those who were killed by the hit squad were actually connected to the Warden; the drug lord worked with the Warden and the Commissioner was getting too close to discovering the Warden's activities. Angered, Wei threatens the Warden, but is talked down from doing anything further from his partner, who replies that everything the Warden said is on tape. The Warden is arrested and Wei returns to his life as a cop.

Cast
 Jackie Chan as Da Chui / Lung (Hong Kong version) / Steve (US version)
 Andy Lau as Iron Ball / Lau / Boss Lee
 Sammo Hung as Fatty John Liu Hsi-chia
 Tony Leung Ka-fai as Wang Wei / Andy / Andrew
 Tou Chung-hua as Chiu / Charlie (as Tao Chung Hwa)
 Barry Wong as Inspector Wong
 Jimmy Wang Yu as Kui / Lucas (as Wang Yu)
 Ko Chun-hsiung as Prison Chief / Prison Superintendent
 Jack Kao as Ho Lin
 Ken Lo as Bodyguard
 Rocky Lai as Iron Ball's thug / Prisoner
 Chin Ho as Iron Ball's assistant
 Teddy Yip Wing-cho as Prisoner
 Wang An
 Yen Ru-chen
 Kao Ming
 Kang Ho
 Fang Jing
 Yuen Yi
 Wai Hung-ho
 Tou Hu
 Wang Yao
 Bang Yu
 Chien Tsao

Special Participation
 Subas Herrero as a police officer (uncredited)
 Conrad Poe as Col. Sam (uncredited)

Versions
There are two different versions of this film: a 96-minute Hong Kong version and a 125-minute Taiwan version which focuses more on character development and plot detail.

See also
 Andy Lau filmography
 Jackie Chan filmography
 List of Hong Kong films
 List of Taiwanese films
 Sammo Hung filmography

References

External links
 Island of Fire at the IMDB

1990 films
1990 action thriller films
1990 martial arts films
1990s prison films
Films directed by Kevin Chu
Films set in Taiwan
Films set in the Philippines
Golden Harvest films
Gun fu films
Hong Kong action thriller films
Hong Kong martial arts films
Kung fu films
1990s Mandarin-language films
Hong Kong prison films
Films shot in the Philippines
1990s Hong Kong films